Staňkovice is a municipality and village in Kutná Hora District in the Central Bohemian Region of the Czech Republic. It has about 300 inhabitants.

Administrative parts
Villages of Chlum, Nová Ves, Ostašov and Smilovice are administrative parts of Staňkovice.

References

Villages in Kutná Hora District